The Institution of Engineering and Technology (IET) awards achievement medals to recognize engineers who have been significant contribution to various fields in engineering
Every year, the award committee seeks and evaluates nominations and
makes decision on winners. There is no age limit or nationality requirement. It is an international award.

Technical Fields 

The awards are made to recognize specific fields in engineering:
 Information & Telecommunication
 Electronics
 Control Engineering
 Manufacturing
 Transport Engineering
 Environmental Engineering
 Energy

Naming of Awards 

The IET Achievement Medals are named after prominent scientists and engineers.
They include:
 J. J. Thomson - for electronics
 John Ambrose Fleming - for communications
 R. E. B. Crompton - for energy
 Oliver Heaviside - for control
 Monty Finniston - for general engineering
 Sarah Guppy - for environment
 Eric Mensforth - for manufacturing

The awards are sponsored by several companies, such as BAE Systems, Lockheed Martin, 
BP, RS, Pace, e-ON, EDF energy networks, GCHQ, Transport for London, etc.

Award Ceremony 

Each year, the award is presented in London, UK.

The ceremony is attended 
by the IET President, distinguished guests, winners and their families and 
industry sponsors of the event. Also at this ceremony, winners of 
the IET Faraday Medal and recipient of IET Honorary 
Fellow will also be announced on this occasion.
Some photos taken at the award ceremony can be found here.

Winners 
An overview of some of the medalists since 2000 is shown below.

IET J J THOMSON MEDAL

IET AMBROSE FLEMING MEDAL

IET CROMPTON MEDAL

IET HEAVISIDE MEDAL

IET MENSFORTH MEDAL

A full list of winners since 1987 can be found on the IET website.

See also

 List of engineering awards
 List of awards named after people
 IET Faraday Medal
 IET Mountbatten Medal

References

External links 
 IET honors professor with achievement medal - News report from Washington University in St. Louis -  
 GOSPEL - European Union Framework 6TH Program - Short Review of IET Achievement Award - 
 Southwest Business News - Short Review of IET Achievement Award -
 Awards Intelligence - Short Review of IET Achievement Award - 

British science and technology awards
Engineering awards
Institution of Engineering and Technology
International awards